Eiyuden Chronicle: Rising is a 2022 action role-playing game developed by Natsume Atari and published by 505 Games. Rising is the first game to be released in the Eiyuden Chronicle series, considered to be a spiritual successor to the Suikoden series. 

The game was originally announced in June 2020 as a collaboration between multiple veteran Suikoden series developers, including series creator Yoshitaka Murayama, who served as the director of Rising. The game was developed as a stretch goal for Eiyuden Chronicle: Hundred Heroes on the crowdfunding platform Kickstarter. The project's main studio, Rabbit & Bear Studios, assisted Natsume Atari in the development of Rising.

Eiyuden Chronicle: Rising was released for Microsoft Windows, Nintendo Switch, PlayStation 4, PlayStation 5, Xbox One, and Xbox Series X/S on May 10, 2022. Most versions of the game were met with a mixed critical reception.

Gameplay 
Eiyuden Chronicle: Rising is a 2D side-scrolling action role-playing game, where the player explores a labyrinthine series of rooms presented as a platform game. Players may backtrack to explore areas within a room that were previously impossible to reach as they progress the narrative, a common convention in Metroidvania games. The player assumes the role of a teenage girl named CJ as she arrives in the town of New Nevaeh in search of adventure and treasure, where she meets other characters who joins her as party companions. The player may switch between these characters instantly at any time. Besides fighting enemies, the player also gains experience points to level up their characters by performing quests for non-player characters, as well as stamps from these characters as a reward for CJ's services.

Development and release 
Eiyuden Chronicle: Rising is a companion title which serves as a prequel to the larger Eiyuden Chronicle: Hundred Heroes. Rising was proposed as a stretch goal for the fundraising campaign for the development of Hundred Heroes, which was conducted through the crowdfunding platform Kickstarter. While Hundred Heroes is designed as a sprawling role-playing game with turn-based combat and a large number of companion characters, Rising is intended to be a smaller project in scale, with its key features being "fast-paced combat, town-building mechanics and 2.5D platforming."

Rising was announced during E3 2021 for a 2022 release following the decision by Rabbit and Bear Studios to delay Hundred Heroes to 2023. Eiyuden Chronicle: Rising was released on May 10, 2022 with 505 Games as its publisher. It simultaneously launched worldwide for Windows, Nintendo Switch, PlayStation 4, PlayStation 5, Xbox One, and Xbox Series X/S. It was also included with the Xbox Game Pass subscription service upon release.

Reception 

Eiyuden Chronicle: Rising received "mixed or average" reviews according to review aggregator Metacritic.

Destructoid gave the game an 8 out of 10, and noted that while the rote dungeons, slow pacing, basic combat, and linear structure might underwhelm players, its personal, small-scale character-based moments, visual style, and low price more than made up for these faults. Game Informer faulted Rising for its dry story, undeveloped characters, bland combat, mandatory side quests, and hollow progression, writing, "Pretty visuals can only get you far, however, and Eiyuden Chronicle: Rising doesn’t offer enough entertaining or unique content to keep it from being anything more than a passable RPG." GameSpot felt that the game had satisfying town-building elements, solid multi-character action gameplay, and good worldbuilding with fun characters and dialogue, but disliked the abundance of filler dialogue, backtracking, and jerky character animations. Hardcore Gamer thought that the world and combat were fun but noted that the limited scope of the game caused long stretches of backtracking, and ultimately concluded that the title was "more than the sum of its parts." IGN took issue with the overly simplistic and easy nature of the combat towards the beginning of the game and found the mission structure to be incredibly repetitive but praised the dynamic cast of characters and townbuilding mechanics. Nintendo Life similarly praised the enjoyable combat, pleasing aesthetic, and charming characters but thought Rising's weaknesses heavily outweighed its strengths, writing, "This game certainly has charm, but it makes you work too hard for it." Nintendo World Report gave the game a 6 out of 10 and wrote, "Eiyuden Chronicle: Rising relies too heavily on [town-building mechanics], at the cost of telling an engaging story or offering compelling action gameplay. The too-frequent backtracking, mind-numbing side quests, and overall lack of variety make for an experience that is tough to recommend." Push Square thought similarly, writing, "If you can stomach its disappointingly dull quests, Eiyuden Chronicle: Rising is a solid enough action RPG. Some pretty visuals and a cosy JRPG vibe do a lot to mask its flaws."

References

External links 

2022 video games
Kickstarter-funded video games
Nintendo Switch games
Platform games
PlayStation 4 games
PlayStation 5 games
Single-player video games
Video games developed in Japan
Video games featuring female protagonists
Video games set in forests
Windows games
Xbox One games
Xbox Series X and Series S games
Video games scored by Hiroyuki Iwatsuki
505 Games games